Mountain Born is a children's historical novel by Elizabeth Yates. Set in the sparsely populated Rocky Mountains during the 19th century, it describes the life of a shepherd's family. The novel, illustrated by Nora Spicer Unwin, was first published in 1943 by Coward-McCann and was a Newbery Honor recipient in 1944. In 1972 a movie based on the book was broadcast on 'The Wonderful World of Disney'. Shot in Telluride, Colorado, it starred Sam Austin as the shepherd boy.

References

1943 American novels
Children's historical novels
American children's novels
Newbery Honor-winning works
Novels set in the 19th century
American novels adapted into films
1943 children's books
Coward-McCann books